Ibrahim (Abai) Qunanbaiūly was a Kazakh poet, composer and Hanafi Maturidi theologian philosopher. He was also a cultural reformer toward European and Russian cultures on the basis of enlightened Islam. Among Kazakhs he is known simply as Abai.

Early life and education 
Abai was born in Karauyl village in Chingiz volost of Semipalatinsk uyezd of the Russian Empire (this is now in Abay District of East Kazakhstan). He was the son of Qunanbai and Uljan, his father's second wife. They named him Ibrahim, as the family was Muslim, and he stuck with the name for the first few years of his life.
Ibrahim first studied at a local madrasah under Mullah Ahmed Ryza. During his early childhood years in Ryza's tutelage, he received the nickname “Abai” (which means “careful”), a nickname that stayed with him for the rest of his life.  His father was wealthy enough to send Abai to a Russian secondary school in Semipalatinsk. There he read the writings of Mikhail Lermontov and Alexander Pushkin, which were influential to his own development as a writer. Moreover, he was fond of reading eastern poetry, including the Shahnameh and One Thousand and One Nights.

Contributions 
Abai's main contribution to Kazakh culture and folklore lies in his poetry, which expresses great nationalism and grew out of Kazakh folk culture. Before him, most Kazakh poetry was oral, echoing the nomadic habits of the people of the Kazakh steppes. During Abai's lifetime, however, a number of important socio-political and socio-economic changes occurred.  influence continued to grow in Kazakhstan, resulting in greater educational possibilities as well as exposure to a number of different philosophies, whether Russian, Western or Asian. Abai Qunanbaiuly steeped himself in the cultural and philosophical history of these newly opened geographies. In this sense, Abai's creative poetry affected the philosophical theological thinking of educated Kazakhs.

Legacy

The leaders of the Alash Orda movement saw him as their inspiration and spiritual predecessor.

Contemporary Kazakh images of Abai generally depict him in full traditional dress holding a dombra (the Kazakh national instrument). Today, Kazakhs revere Abai as one of the first folk heroes to enter into the national consciousness of his people. Kazakh National Pedagogical University is named after Abai, so is one of the main avenues in the city of Almaty. There are also public schools with his name. Abai is featured on postal stamps of Kazakhstan, Soviet Union, and India.
The Kazakh city of Abay and the Abai Region are named after him.
Among Abai's students was his nephew, a historian, philosopher, and poet Shakarim Qudayberdiuli (1858–1931).

Statues of him have been erected in many cities of Kazakhstan, as well as Beijing, Moscow, New Delhi, Tehran, Berlin, Cairo, Istanbul, Antalya, Kyiv, and Budapest.

Abai is featured on the Kazakhstani Tenge, a subway station in Almaty is named after him, along with a street, a square, a theater, and many schools.
In 1995, the 150th anniversary of Abai's birth, UNESCO celebrated it with the "Year of Abai" event. A film on the life of Abai was made by Kazakhfilm in 1995, titled Abai. He is also the subject of two novels and an opera by Mukhtar Auezov, another Kazakhstani writer.
Another film describing his father's life was made in December 2015, titled "Qunanbai". In 2016, Qunanbai film has been selected for the 12th Kazan International Muslim Film Festival. Only 60 of 700 applied films from countries passed the official selection.
In 2016, Abai Qunanbaiuly was chosen as one of the nominees in the "proposed candidates" category of the national project «El Tulgasy» (Name of the Motherland) The idea of the project was to select the most significant and famous citizens of Kazakhstan whose names are now associated with the achievements of the country. More than 350,000 people voted in this project, and Abai was voted into fifth place in his category.

In 2020, the government of Kazakhstan announced plans to celebrate the 175th anniversary of his birthday throughout the year.

In 2020, the Park and memorial plaque in honor of Abai opened in Antalya, Turkey.

In August 2021, a monument to Abai opened in Seoul, South Korea. Kazakh President Kassym-Jomart Tokayev took part in the opening ceremony.

In October 2021, a monument dedicated to Abai was unveiled in Berlin, Germany.

In December 2021, a monument honoring Abai was unveiled in Paris, France, as part of a celebration of the 30th anniversary of Kazakhstan's independence.

On December 30, 2021, a monument to the great poet and educator Abai Kunanbaev was erected in Atyrau in front of the center of Abai.

On April 29, 2022, a monument created by a Georgia sculptor was opened in Tbilisi, the image of a Kazakh thinker and educator will always remind of the friendship of the two peoples. The avenue next to the square where the monument was erected will also bear the name of Abay Kunanbayev.

On May 26, 2022, a monument dedicated to the friendly relations between Kazakhstan and Kyrgyzstan was unveiled in Bishkek. The opening of the monument was attended by the President of Kazakhstan Kassym-Jomart Tokayev and the President of Kyrgyzstan Sadyr Zhaparov

On June 2, 2022, a bust of Abai was installed in San martin Square in New Delhi.

Works
Abai also translated into Kazakh the works of Russian and European authors, mostly for the first time. Translations made by him include poems by Mikhail Lermontov, Johann Wolfgang von Goethe, Lord Byron, Ivan Krylov's Fables and Alexander Pushkin's Eugene Onegin.

Abai's major work is The Book of Words, a theological philosophic treatise and collection of poems where he encourages his fellow Kazakhs to embrace education, literacy, and good moral character in order to escape poverty, enslavement and corruption. In Word Twenty Five, he discusses the importance of Russian culture, as a way for Kazakhs to be exposed to the world's cultural treasures.

Moscow protests in May 2012

On 9 May 2012, after two days of protests in Moscow following Vladimir Putin's inauguration as President of the Russian Federation for the third term, protesters set up camp near the monument to Abai Qunanbaiuly on the Chistoprudny Boulevard in central Moscow, close to the embassy of Kazakhstan. The statue quickly became a reference point for the protest's participants. OccupyAbai was among the top ranking hashtags on Twitter for several days thanks to Russian opposition leader Alexey Navalny who set up a meeting with his followers next to Abai Qunanbaiuly's monument in Moscow that he called "a monument to some unknown Kazakh". This spurred a wave of indignation among ethnic Kazakhs who highly esteem Abai. This also brought Abai's poetry into the top 10 AppStore downloads.

References

External links

 Biography of Abay
 Site dedicated to Abay
 «Kara Sozder» (Book of Words) 
 Poems by Abay 
 IMDB page for the 1995 biopic

1845 births
1904 deaths
People from Abay District, East Kazakhstan
Kazakh-language poets
Kazakh-language writers
Kazakhstani Muslims
Kazakhstani translators
Russian–Kazakh translators
Kazakhstani composers
Male composers
19th-century poets
19th-century translators
19th-century male musicians
Translators of Johann Wolfgang von Goethe
Hanafis
Maturidis
Kazakhstani writers